The 2015 season was Remo's 101st existence. The club participated in the Campeonato Brasileiro Série D, the Campeonato Paraense, the Copa Verde and the Copa do Brasil.

Remo finished in the 3rd place of the Campeonato Brasileiro Série D, conquering the promotion to the Série C of the following year. Remo also won the Campeonato Paraense, totalizing 44 titles of the championship. In the Copa Verde, the club was runner-up after losing the final by Cuiabá 6-5 on aggregate. In the Copa do Brasil, Remo was eliminated in the first round by Atlético Paranaense, after tied 2-2 on aggregate but lose on penalties by 5-4.

Players

Squad information
Numbers in parentheses denote appearances as substitute.

Top scorers

Disciplinary record

Kit
Supplier: Umbro / Main sponsor: Nação Azul

Transfers

Transfers in

Transfers out

Competitions

Campeonato Brasileiro Série D

Group stage

Matches

Final stage

Round of 16

Quarter-finals

Semi-finals

Campeonato Paraense

First round

Matches

Second round

Matches

Final stage

Final

Copa Verde

Round of 16

Quarter-finals

Semi-finals

Finals

Copa do Brasil

First round

References

External links
Official Site 
Remo 100% 

2015 season
Clube do Remo seasons
Brazilian football clubs 2015 season